Michael Makuei Lueth is a South Sudanese politician. He is the current Information, Communication, Technology, and Postal Services Minister in the Revitalised Transitional Government of National Unity (RTGoNU).

Lueth is from Bor, in a payam called Makuac payam and a clan called Koc. He joined the Sudan Peoples Liberation Army in 1983 to fight for the liberation of South Sudan along with his other comrades. He graduated as a lawyer at the University of Khartoum in 1977 and worked as a legal Counsel and as a Judge. It is with this background that he has been serving as the minister of information in the transitional government of National Unity in the Republic of South Sudan as of 2022.

Sanctions 
Lueth is currently on the list of Specially Designated Nationals and Blocked Persons list of the United States Office of Foreign Assets Control. The sanctions were placed on him in September 2017 after reports emerged that Lueth was instrumental in undermining Kiir's initial willingness to sign the peace agreement.

The United Kingdom also sanctioned the politician for "obstructing the political process in South Sudan, in particular by obstructing the implementation of the Agreement on the Resolution of the Conflict in South Sudan."

COVID-19
On 19 May 2020, he and all members of the nation's 15-member coronavirus task force tested positive for COVID-19.

See also
 SPLM
 SPLA
 Cabinet of South Sudan

References

External links
Website of Government of South Sudan
U.S. Embassy in South Sudan press release

Living people
Government ministers of South Sudan
Year of birth missing (living people)